Joseph Jacinto Mora (October 22, 1876 – October 10, 1947) was a Uruguayan-born American cowboy, photographer, artist, cartoonist, illustrator, painter, muralist, sculptor, and historian who lived with the Hopi and wrote about his experiences in California. He has been called the "Renaissance Man of the West".

Early life

Mora was born on October 22, 1876 in Montevideo, Uruguay. His father was the Catalan sculptor, Domingo Mora, and his mother was Laura Gaillard Mora, an intellectual born in the Bordeaux region of France. His elder brother was F. Luis Mora, who would become an artist and the first Hispanic member of the National Academy of Design. The family entered the United States in 1880 and first settled in New York City, and then Perth Amboy, New Jersey.

Career

Jo Mora studied art at the Art Students League of New York and the Cowles Art School in Boston. He also studied with William Merritt Chase. He worked as a cartoonist for the Boston Evening Traveller, and later, the Boston Herald.

In the spring of 1903, Mora arrived in Solvang, California. He stayed at the Donohue Ranch. He made plans to travel to the Southwest to paint and photograph the Hopi. He spent time at the Mission Santa Inés; those photographs are now maintained by the Smithsonian Institution.  Mora visited many Spanish missions in California that summer by horseback. He followed the "Mission Trail", also called the "Kings Highway".

In 1904, Mora visited Yosemite. Later, in 1904, to 1906, Mora lived with the Hopi and Navajo near Oraibi, Arizona. He took photographs, painted and otherwise recorded the daily life of these Native Americans, including the Hopi Snake Dance. He learned the Native languages and made detailed drawings of what he observed.

In 1907, Mora returned to California and married Grace Needham. Their son, Joseph Needham Mora, was born on March 8, 1908.  The Moras moved to San Jose, California, where Mora continued his work.

On 22 February 1911, the Native Sons of the Golden West Building, in San Francisco, with six terra cotta panels, by Domingo Mora and his son, Jo Mora, was dedicated.

In 1915, he served on the International Jury of Awards at the Panama–Pacific International Exposition and displayed six sculptures.  

In 1915-16 two of his sculptural commissions were revealed: the bronze memorial tablet with the profile of the late Archbishop Patrick W. Riordan for the Knights of Columbus and the Cervantes Monument in San Francisco's Golden Gate Park.  By 1919, he was sculpting for the Bohemian Club, including the Bret Harte Memorial plaque, completed in August 1919 and mounted on the outside of the private men's club building in San Francisco.

In 1921 the Mora family moved their primary residence to the largest art colony on the West Coast, Carmel-by-the-Sea. Mora received a commission for the bronze and travertine Cenotaph, for Father Junípero Serra in the Memorial Chapel at the west end of Mission Carmel.  He served on the board of directors of the Carmel Art Association, where his sculptures were exhibited between 1927 and 1934.  He co-established Carmel's first private art gallery which was operated by resident artists.

 

On July 22, 1922, for the opening day of the Carmel Woods subdivision, Mora had carved and painted a wooded statue of Padre Junípero Serra, which was installed within a small wooden shrine, surrounded by plants and a pair of wooden benches at the entrance to the development, at the intersection of Camino del Monte and Alta Avenue.

In 1925, he designed the commemorative half dollar for the California Diamond Jubilee. During this period he also illustrated a number of books, made large murals, and published charts, maps (cartes) and diagrams of the West and Western themes. Beginning in 1937, Mora wrote and illustrated children's books about the West. In 1939, a Works Progress Administration project was completed, with Mora bas-relief sculpture adorning the King City High School Auditorium building.

In 1931 Jo, his wife, and daughter Patricia moved to nearby Pebble Beach into a newly built home. Five years later in the adjoining large studios he completed his massive diorama, Discovery of the San Francisco Bay by Portola, for the California Pavilion at the 1939-40 Golden Gate International Exposition on Treasure Island.  At a length of almost 100 feet, with 64 sculptures of Spaniards and Indians and over 200 animals, it was said "to surpass anything of its kind at the Fair."  He fashioned smaller dioramas for the Will Rogers Memorial Museum in Claremore, Oklahoma and the Sutter's Fort Museum in Sacramento, California.

"El Paseo" sculpture and the Carmel Dairy

In 1928, Mora made the "El Paseo" sculpture in the courtyard of the El Paseo Building on Dolores Street and 7th Avenue in Carmel. The sculpture was recorded with the National Register of Historic Places on January 20, 2002, as an example of the artistic and cultural contributions of Mora to Carmel in the 1920s. It is a terracotta sculpture of a Californio man and a Señorita woman.

In the early 1930s, Mora was commissioned by Earl F. Graft to decorate the Carmel Dairy Building in Carmel. Mora made three large interior dairy murals above a soda fountain (no longer present) and a sculptured a metal lamp in the shape of a cowbell that still hangs above the buildings front door. He showed animal figures dressed as humans, many recognizable as local Carmel residents. He also designed the menus, Christmas cards, and milk bottles, with these animal characterizations, and a cow that served as the logo. The Santa Rosa Republican described Mora's work with an article having the title: "Carmel's Prosaic Dairy is Art."

Between 1908 and the late 1940s his sculptures, illustrations, watercolors and etchings were frequently exhibited across the United States.

Death
Mora died October 10, 1947, in Monterey, California.  His last book, Californios, which was devoted to the life of the rancheros of Alta California, was published posthumously.

In music
Mora's image, "Evolution of the Cowboy", a 1933 poster, reprinted in 1939, promoting the California Rodeo Salinas, next re-purposed, beginning in 1950, as Levi Strauss & Co. advertising, and later, part of the poster, the image of the Sweetheart of the Rodeo, was used on The Byrds' 1968 album Sweetheart of the Rodeo.
Western performer Mike Beck's album Where the Green Grass Grows includes a song about Mora entitled "In Old California".  It was written by Beck and Ian Tyson.

Coinage
Mora designed the 1925 California Diamond Jubilee half dollar.

Works

Bibliography
 When I Get Wound Up Writing I'm a Bad Article to Squelch: The Written Words of Jo Mora by Peter Hiller. (2008) .
 The Life and Times of Jo Mora: Iconic Artist of the American West by Peter Hiller. Published by the Book Club of California, San Francisco, CA. October 2019. .
 The Life and Times of Jo Mora: Iconic Artist of the American West by Peter Hiller. Published by Gibbs-Smith, Layton, Utah. April, 2021.  (Hardcover)

Museum Catalogs
The Year of the Hopi: Paintings and Photographs by Joseph Mora, 1904-'06, Smithsonian Institution, Washington, D. C., 1979
Jo Mora: Artist and Writer, Monterey Museum of Art, 1998
Back to the Drawing Board with Artist Jo Mora, Monterey History and Art Association, Monterey, CA, 2003

Gallery

References

External links

Jo Mora Trust site
Profile by Monterey Museum of Art
California Views: The Pat Hathaway Photo Collection - Jo Mora
Cline Library Jo Mora Photo Collection 
Californios
Brief profile of Mora
 Lambiek Comiclopedia article.

1876 births
1947 deaths
People from Montevideo
Uruguayan people of Catalan descent
Uruguayan people of French descent
American people of Catalan descent
American people of French descent
American cartoonists
American comics artists
American muralists
Art Students League of New York alumni
Western United States
American cartographers
American photographers
Hopi
Federal Art Project artists
Uruguayan emigrants to the United States
20th-century American sculptors
American male sculptors
20th-century American painters
American male painters
People from Pebble Beach, California
Sculptors from New York (state)
American currency designers
Coin designers
Uruguayan cartoonists
Uruguayan comics artists
Uruguayan muralists
Uruguayan photographers
20th-century Uruguayan painters
20th-century male artists
20th-century American male artists
20th-century Uruguayan sculptors